The Fairbury Shaners were a minor league baseball team were based in Fairbury, Nebraska. In 1915, the Shaners played as a member of the Class D level Nebraska State League, before the league folded during the season with the Shaners in 4th place. The "Shaners" were nicknamed by local newspapers for their manager Bert Shaner and hosted minor league home games at Fairbury City Park. When the Nebraska State League resumed play in 1922, the Fairbury Jeffersons began play in the reformed league.

History
Minor league baseball began in Fairbury, Nebraska in 1915, when the Fairbury "Shaners" became members of the eight–team Class D level Nebraska State League Fairbury replaced the Superior Brickmakers franchise in the league. Fairbury paid $400.00 for the Superior franchise, a price which included bats, balls and team uniforms. The former Superior uniforms were sold by Fairbury for $100.00. 

Fairbury was managed by Bert Shaner in 1915, corresponding to the team "Shaners" nickname, given by local newspapers. 

Fairbury was joined by the Beatrice Milkskimmers, Columbus Pawnees, Grand Island Champions, Hastings Reds, Kearney Buffaloes, Norfolk Drummers and 
York Prohibitionists in beginning Nebraska State League play on May 14, 1915.

The Shaners' home opener drew over 1,000 fans for the opening day festivities at Fairbury City Park. Fairbury Mayor Mason threw out the ceremonial first pitch, with Fairbury club president Wes Crawford serving as the catcher. 

In their first season of minor league play, 1915 Fairbury placed 4th in the eight–team Nebraska State League final standings. Four of the eight league teams folded during the season, before the league itself folded on July 18, 1915. The Shaners ended the season with a record of 22–31, playing the season under manager Bert Shaner. During the season, the Columbus, Grand Island, Kearney and Norfolk teams folded and left the Nebraska State League with four remaining teams. On July 18, 1915, the Shaners were 13.0 games behind the 1st place Beatrice Milkskimmers when the Nebraska State League folded. Beatrice (35–18) was followed by Hastings (30–27) and York (25–31) in finishing ahead of Fairbury.

Fremont, Nebraska native and former major league pitcher Harry Smith attended tryouts for the team before the season, but did not appear on the final roster. Future major league players Eddie Brown and Lyman Lamb played for Fairbury in 1915. Brown was sold to the Mason City Claydiggers for $500.00 during the season, after hitting .314 in 35 games for Fairbury.

After a seven–season hiatus, the 1922 Nebraska State League returned to play, with a Fairbury franchise. The 1922 Fairbury Jeffersons defeated Norfolk in the Finals to win the league championship.

The ballpark
The Fairbury Shaners' home minor league ballpark in 1915 was City Park. Today, the Fairbury City Park is still in use as a public park with ballfields. The park is located at 421 Park Road.

Year–by–year record

Notable alumni
Eddie Brown (1915)
Lyman Lamb (1915)
Harry Smith (1915)*

See also
Fairbury Shaners players

External links
Baseball Reference

References

Defunct baseball teams in Nebraska
Nebraska State League teams
Baseball teams established in 1915
Baseball teams disestablished in 1915
Jefferson County, Nebraska